Ada Punga is a town in the Federally Administered Tribal Areas of Pakistan. It is about 216 mi (or 348 km) south-west of Islamabad, the country's capital place.

References

Populated places in Khyber Pakhtunkhwa